CHRM-FM is a French-language Canadian radio station located in Matane, Quebec.

Owned and operated by Les Communications Matane Inc., it broadcasts on 105.3 MHz using an omnidirectional antenna with an effective radiated power of 30,000 watts (class B).  CHRM-FM also operates a relay, CHRM-FM-1 in Les Méchins which operates on 91.3 MHz using a directional antenna with an average effective radiated power of 23 watts and a peak effective radiated power of 49 watts (class LP).

The station has an adult contemporary format, and has occasionally had some talk programming and sports play-by-play.

Originally known as CHRM when the station was on the AM band on 1290 kHz, the station moved to FM in 2001. CHRM went on the air on April 13, 1975 and was the first local private radio service in Matane since CKBL (now CBGA-FM) was bought by Radio-Canada in 1972.

The relay in Les Méchins, which was added as part of the conversion to FM, was originally on 104.1 MHz; it was moved to 91.3 MHz in 2005.

References

External links
 Official site
 
 

Hrm
Hrm
Hrm
Matane
Radio stations established in 2001
2001 establishments in Quebec